HD 49268 (HR 2505) is a solitary star in the southern circumpolar constellation Volans. It has an apparent magnitude of +6.49, placing it near the limit of naked eye visibility.

The stellar classification of HD 49268 is K1 III CNII, indicating that it is an ageing red giant with a strong over-abundance of cyano radical in its stellar atmosphere. It has  136% the mass of the Sun but expanded to 10.77 times its girth. HD 49268 is slightly metal enriched with an iron abundance 117% that of the Sun and is believed to be a member of the thick disk population.

Both are unrelated background stars.

References 

K-type giants
Volans (constellation)
CD-71 00357
049268
031977
2505
Volantis, 2
CN stars